Storenosoma is a genus of Australian tangled nest spiders first described by Henry Roughton Hogg in 1900.

Species
 it contains thirteen species:
Storenosoma altum Davies, 1986 – Australia (Queensland, New South Wales)
Storenosoma bifidum Milledge, 2011 – Australia (Victoria)
Storenosoma bondi Milledge, 2011 – Australia (New South Wales)
Storenosoma forsteri Milledge, 2011 – Australia (New South Wales, Australian Capital Territory)
Storenosoma grayi Milledge, 2011 – Australia (New South Wales)
Storenosoma grossum Milledge, 2011 – Australia (Victoria)
Storenosoma hoggi (Roewer, 1942) – Australia (New South Wales, Victoria)
Storenosoma picadilly Milledge, 2011 – Australia (New South Wales, Australian Capital Territory)
Storenosoma smithae Milledge, 2011 – Australia (New South Wales)
Storenosoma supernum Davies, 1986 – Australia (Queensland, New South Wales)
Storenosoma tasmaniensis Milledge, 2011 – Australia (Tasmania)
Storenosoma terraneum Davies, 1986 – Australia (Queensland to Victoria)
Storenosoma victoria Milledge, 2011 – Australia (Victoria)

References

Amaurobiidae
Araneomorphae genera
Spiders of Australia